Bumble and bumble Products, LLC, known more commonly as Bumble and Bumble is a hair salon and product company established in 1977 by hairdresser and entrepreneur Michael Gordon.

Bumble and Bumble is one of 27 brands owned by Estée Lauder Companies, Inc.

References

External links

Companies based in New York City
Retail companies established in 1977
Cosmetics companies of the United States
Hair salons
Estée Lauder Companies brands
1977 establishments in New York (state)
Hair care products